The Academia Europaea is a pan-European Academy of Humanities, Letters, Law, and Sciences.
The Academia was founded in 1988 as a functioning Europe-wide Academy that encompasses all fields of scholarly inquiry. It acts as co-ordinator of European interests in national research agencies.

History 
The concept of a 'European Academy of Sciences' was raised at a meeting in Paris of the European Ministers of Science in 1985. The initiative was taken by the Royal Society (United Kingdom) which resulted in a meeting in London in June 1986 of Arnold Burgen (United Kingdom), Hubert Curien (France), Umberto Colombo (Italy), David Magnusson (Sweden), Eugen Seibold (Germany) and Ruurd van Lieshout (the Netherlands) – who agreed to the need for a new body. The two key purposes of Academia Europaea are:
 express ideas and opinions of individual scientists from Europe
 act as co-ordinator of European interests in national research agencies

It does not aim to replace existing national academy from respective countries. The objectives were kept deliberately broad covering the humanities, social and natural sciences, so as to ensure interdisciplinary discourse and activities. Initial modalities were to include annual meetings of members, multidisciplinary meetings, an interdisciplinary journal, a newsletter, providing independent advice, improving mobility of scholars within Europe and improving public understanding of science.
The new body was named the Academia Europaea and its foundation meeting was held in Cambridge in September 1988 under the first President, Arnold Burgen. Hubert Curien, who was at that time the French Minister of Science (and later became the second President of the Academia), gave the inaugural address and provided the active support of the French government. The first Plenary Meeting was held in London in June 1989, by which time there were 627 members.
Since 1989, the Academia Europaea has evolved from its origins as an organization of predominantly "western European" scholars into a pan-European Academy of Sciences, Humanities and Letters. The funding of the Academy is based on an original endowment, contributions from some of the member countries, special projects and by other organizations like the Leopoldina who is also supporting the Academia Europaea financially.

Mission
The Academy is not a pure science or pure engineering academy. It is an academy that include a range of subjects, covering law, humanities, social sciences, physical sciences, religion, history, etc. Its mission is to:

Promote a wider appreciation of the value of European scholarship and research.
Make recommendations to national governments and international agencies concerning matters affecting science, scholarship and academic life in Europe.
Encourage interdisciplinary and international research in all areas of learning, particularly in relation to European issues.
Identify topics of trans-European importance to science and scholarship, and propose appropriate action to ensure that these issues are adequately studied.

The Academy endeavors to; (a) encourage the highest possible standards in scholarship, research and education, and (b) promote a better understanding among the public at large of the benefits of knowledge and learning, and of scientific and scholarly issues which affect society, its quality of life and its standards of living.

Presidents
Arnold Burgen (1988–1994)
Hubert Curien (1994–1997)
Stig Strömholm (1997–2002)
Jürgen Mittelstraß (2002–2008)
Lars Walløe (2008–2014)
Sierd Cloetingh (2014-2021)
Marja Makarow (since 2021)

Academic management
The scholarly interests of the Academia are managed through a section structure. On election, all members are assigned to a section. At the present time there are twenty academic sections covering
Applied and Translational Biology
Behavioural Sciences
Biochemistry and Molecular Biology
Cell Biology
Chemical Sciences
Classics & Oriental Studies
Earth and Cosmic Sciences
Economics, Business and Management Sciences
History & Archaeology
Informatics
Law
Linguistic Studies
Literary & Theatrical Studies
Mathematics
Musicology & History of Art & Architecture
Organismic and Evolutionary Biology
Philosophy, Theology & Religious Studies
Physics and Engineering Sciences
Physiology and Medicine
Social Sciences

It elects members from 47 Council of Europe states in recognition of their academic achievements. Election to the membership has been celebrated by several institutions as an honor each year. Elected members are entitled to the post-nominal letters MAE.
Assisted by the SAM secretariat, the Academia works together with All European Academies, European Academies Science Advisory Council, Euro-CASE and the Federation of European Academies of Medicine in a consortium called Science Advice for Policy by European Academies (SAPEA). SAPEA pulls together scientific expertise from the pan-European Academia and more than 100 European national academies from over 40 countries, collectively providing independent policy advice to the European Commissioners.
The Academia serves as official advisor to the European Union under the Scientific Advice Mechanism.

Award and prizes
 Membership of the Academia Europaea is awarded annually to selected scientists
Erasmus Medal Lecture is a highlight of the year of the Academia Europaea. It is awarded to honor individual European scholarship and achievements over a sustained period.
 The Academia Europaea Burgen Scholarships provide recognition to younger European scholars, at the post-doctoral level, who are emerging talents and possible potential future leaders in their fields.
 The Russian Prizes for young scientists and scholars in Russia.
 The Gold Medal of the Academia Europaea is awarded to non-members of the Academia and to organizations in recognition of the contribution made to European science through inspiration, public support, management expertise or by financial means.
 The Adam Kondorosi Academia Europaea Award recognizes landmark research in symbiosis and related fields that has changed our understanding and made a significant scientific impact.

Publications
The Academia Europaea has published European Review (ER) since 1993 on behalf of members and in conjunction with the Cambridge University Press (since 1998). ER is a quarterly, peer reviewed and international journal.

Editorial control is in the hands of an independent board. European Review publishes articles and reviews that will be of broad interest to an intellectual readership, world-wide. Contributions come from academics, professionals and those in public life and address multi, and interdisciplinary issues across the sciences arts, humanities and Letters. European Review provides the AE with a vehicle for publication of articles from sponsored conferences and workshops. The editorial board invites specific contributions and reviews from opinion leaders world-wide. European Review has become available fully on-line.

Offices
The registered office and headquarters of the Academia Europaea is based in London. This is also the location of the General Secretariat.

In collaboration with local and regional partners, the Academia Europaea has established a number of regional hubs:
 The Academia Europaea Wrocław Knowledge Hub – operational since January 2012 with focus on: knowledge activities, including international events, summer schools, lecture series and high-level expert panes and 'Emeritus' scholarship; support to Central and Eastern European scholars.
 The Academia Europaea Barcelona Knowledge Hub – operational since January 2013 with focus on the promotion of multidisciplinary scientific activities that include the perspective of the social sciences and the humanities.
 The Academia Europaea Bergen Knowledge Hub – operational since spring 2014 with focus on Northern Seas related Resources – Opportunities – Challenges Advancing Europe's Northern Seas Dimension.
The Academia Europaea Cardiff Knowledge Hub – operational since summer 2016 with focus to strengthen pan-European scientific collaboration and infrastructure across all disciplines.
The Academia Europaea Tbilisi Knowledge Hub – operational since spring 2019 with focus to improve the access and use of European scientific achievements for the national and regional policy-making, and to promote education, science and scientific research through collaboration with leading international agencies.
Graz Information Centre – founded in 2010 is responsible for the development and application of the nomination system and membership administration and registration.

See also 
The Academia Europaea is not to be confused with the European Academy of Sciences and Arts or the European Academy of Sciences.

References

External links 

 
Educational organizations based in Europe
International academies
Science and technology in Europe
Pan-European learned societies
Scientific organizations established in 1988